Līga Miljone (born March 20, 1997) is a Latvian ice hockey player. Miljone has been a member of Latvian national team since 2013 and has participated in eight IIHF Women's World Championships at the Division IA, IB, and IIA levels. Liga Miljone has played three seasons (2018-2021) with Maine Black Bears in the Hockey East conference of the NCAA Division I. Prior to her college ice hockey career, Miljone played five seasons in the Swedish Women's Hockey League (SDHL), spending two seasons with Modo Hockey Dam (2013–2015) and three seasons with Leksands IF Dam (2015–2018).

Miljone and her mother, Inese Geca-Miljone, made history as the first mother-daughter duo to play in the same IIHF World Women's Championship, first appearing together at the 2013 Division IA tournament, and again in 2014 and 2016. At the 2017 IIHF Women's World Championship they represented Latvia as player and coach.

Playing career 
Miljone participated in the IIHF European Women's Champions Cup (EWCC) in 2013 with SHK Laima Rīga. The fifteen year old lead the team with a total of 3 points in three games, recording 2 points (1 goal+1 assist) against Vålerenga Ishockey and netting Laima's lone goal against Hvidovre IK. Laima lost all three round robin games in the first round and did not progress in the tournament.

SDHL 

For the 2013–14 season, Miljone moved from her native Latvia to Örnsköldsvik, Sweden in order to play with Modo Hockey Dam of the Riksserien (renamed SDHL in 2015). She joined an impressive roster, which included players from the Swedish, Finnish, and Norwegian national teams, under the captaincy of Erika Grahm, with Emma Nordin and Johanna Olofsson serving as alternates. Miljone recorded 9 points (4+5) in 27 games during her rookie campaign, good for 11th in team scoring despite being the youngest regularly rostered player. Modo Hockey finished the regular season in first place and went on to the 2014 SDHL finals, where they settled for Swedish Championship silver medals after falling to Linköping HC Dam. Miljone followed up her rookie season with 12 points (4+8) in 32 games in her second season with Modo Hockey.

In the 2015–16 SDHL season Miljone left Modo to sign with Leksands IF Dam. She posted 5 goals and 5 assists (10 points) in 29 games. In 2016–17, Miljone scored 11 goals and 9 assists, her highest scoring SDHL season. Miljone was ranked second for scoring on Leksands IF with a total of 20 points. In the 2017–18 SDHL season, Miljone posted 8 goals and 8 assists in 30 games.

NCAA 
For the 2018-19 season, Miljone moved from Sweden to Maine, United States of America to play with Maine Black Bears of the NCAA Division I Hockey East. Miljone recorded 12 points (3+9) in 27 games during her rookie campaign and scored her first collegiate goal in her second collegiate game. 
Miljone followed up her rookie season with 28 points (10+18) in 37 games in her second season with Maine Black Bears. Miljone was ranked third on Maine Black Bears with 10 goals, 89 shots, 43 blocked shots, and ranked second on the team with 18 assists. Maine Black Bears beat Boston University in quarterfinals in best-of-3 and played in Hockey East semifinals for the second time in Maine Black Bears history. 
In 2020-21 season, Miljone posted 1 goal and 2 assists, and was ranked fifth on team with 19 blocked shots in only 10 games. Maine Black Bears made it to Hockey East semifinals for the third time in Maine Black Bears history.

International play

Miljone first played in an IIHF tournament in 2013 when she joined the Latvian national team at the 2013 IIHF Women's World Championship Division I Group A in Stavanger, Norway. Remarkably making history with her mother Inese Geca-Miljone as first mother-daughter duo playing in an IIHF tournament. Miljone was named the best Latvian player of the game after scoring her first goal in the national team against Norway. The sixteen year old led Latvian national team with 4 points (3+1) in 5 games and was recognized as the best player of Latvian national team at the 2013 IIHF Women's World Championship Division I.

In 2014 IIHF Women's World Championship Division I Group B games in Ventspils, Latvia, Miljone posted with 3 goals and 3 assists in only 2 games, and was named the best Latvian player of the game against Hungary. Latvian national team finished the tournament with gold medals. 

In 2015 IIHF Women's World Championship Division I Group A in Rouen, France, Miljone led Latvian national team with 3 points (2+1) in 5 games, and was named the best Latvian player of the game against Denmark. 

In 2016 IIHF Women's World Championship Division I Group B in Asiago, Italy, Miljone posted 7 goals in 5 games. Miljone scored her first hat-trick in Latvian national team in only 9 minutes and 24 seconds in the tournaments first game against Kazakhstan, and was named the best Latvian player of the game. Miljone led the tournament with most goals and was named the best player of Latvian national team at the 2016 IIHF Women's World Championship Division I tournament. Latvian national team finished the tournament with silver medals.

Miljone had a career-high 10 point IIHF tournament in 2017 IIHF Women's World Championship Division I Group B in Katowice, Poland. Miljone posted her second career hat-trick in Latvian national team in the first game of the tournament, and was named the best Latvian player of the game against China. Miljone posted 5 goals and 5 assists in 5 games, earning the 2017 IIHF Women's World Championship Division I Group B best forward award. Latvian national team finished the tournament with bronze medals.

In 2018 IIHF Women's World Championship Division I Group B in Asiago, Italy, Miljone posted 2 goals and 2 assists in 5 games, and was named the best Latvian player of the game against China. Latvian national team finished the tournament with bronze medals.

In 2019 IIHF Women's World Championship Division I Group B games in Beijing, China, Miljone posted 1 goal in 4 games. Miljone was named the best Latvian player of the game against Netherlands.

In 2022 IIHF Women's World Championship Division II Group A games in Jaca, Spain, Miljone led Latvian national team with 7 points (5+2) in 4 games. She was named the best Latvian player of the game against Mexico and posted her third career hat-trick in Latvian national team in the game against Chinese Taipei. Miljone led the tournament with most goals (5) and most points (7), and was named the best player of Latvian national team and the best forward at the 2022 IIHF Women's World Championship Division II tournament. Latvian national team finished the tournament with silver medals.

Personal life
Miljone is quadrilingual, she can speak in four different languages.
She has played basketball and floorball.

Career statistics

Regular season and playoffs

European Women's Champions Cup

International

Awards and honours

References

External links
 
 Līga Miljone at the Latvian Ice Hockey Federation 
 Līga Miljone at the University of Maine Athletics
 Līga Miljone at USCHO.com

Living people
1997 births
Ice hockey people from Riga
Latvian women's ice hockey players
Maine Black Bears women's ice hockey players
Leksands IF players
Modo Hockey players
Latvian expatriate ice hockey people
Expatriate ice hockey players in the United States